Master's Hammer are a black metal band from the Czech Republic.  The band has remained active with several lineup changes between 1987 and 1995, with a reunion from 2009 to the present.

It is considered one of the most representative groups of its kind in the country, in interpreting their songs entirely in Czech. In addition, it is one of the precursors to incorporate symphonic metal elements. To a lesser extent, they have experimented with electronic sounds or avant-garde metal.

History 
They were founded in 1987 and produced several demos, before releasing their debut album Ritual in 1991, which sold more than 25,000 copies in the Czech Republic according to the band. Two years later they completed The Jilemnice Occultist (often misspelt as The Filemnice Occultist due to a typo on the booklet).

Their third album (Šlágry in 1995) was a drift away from the previous work incorporating many styles outside the metal genre, and the band announced "that Šlágry II and a forthcoming CD-ROM will rely more on professional opera singers and orchestra players", although this following album was never released.

In 2009 Master's Hammer reformed and released Mantras, their first album in 14 years.

In late 2012, a fifth album called Vracejte konve na místo was released. It was awarded "best hard and heavy album" in that year's Czech music Awards and Břitva Awards.

In July 2013, Master's Hammer formed their own record label, called Jihosound Records, under which they released their sixth studio album in 2014, entitled Vagus Vetus. On 30 May 2016 they released their seventh studio album, Formulæ.

On 8 December 2016 the band announced on their official Facebook page that they had been scheduled to play at the Brutal Assault festival in August 2017, their first live performance in 25 years.

On 10 February 2018 the band released their eighth studio album, Fascinator.

Musical style 
In Kerrang!, Master's Hammer's style was described as "fusing thrash with classical themes", and The Jilemnice Occultist was called "an operetta in three acts featuring such extraordinary titles as 'That Magnificent Deer Has Vanished In The Bush' and 'I Don't Want, Sirs to Pester Your Ears'". Götz Kühnemund from German Rock Hard magazine compared the concept album The Jilemnice Occultist to King Diamond although Master's Hammer's style was "considerably more uncompromising", but the vocals "sound like a mixture of deep King Diamond voices and Quorthon's guttural grunts", Bathory being an obvious influence although Master's Hammer have a sound of their own including keyboards, classical instruments and orchestral passages.

When asked about Ritual, Fenriz, the drummer of the influential Norwegian black metal band Darkthrone, noted that the album "is actually the first Norwegian black metal album, even though they are from Czechoslovakia".

On Šlágry, the band "virtually abandoned the operatic black metal of previous releases in favor of modernist electronic music" and "shares publishing credits with Carl Czerny, Otto Katz, and Giuseppe Verdi, mixing bits of metal, folk, and musique concrète into a style based on the classical avant-garde".

Line-up

Current members
 František "Franta" Štorm – vocals, electric guitar, bass guitar, keyboards, drums 
 Necrocock (Tomáš Kohout) – electric guitar 
 Silenthell (Honza Přibyl) – timpani 
 Jan "Honza" Kapák – drums 
 Petr "Rámus" Mecák – bass guitar 
 Blackie (Petr Hošek) – electric guitar

Former members
 Bathory (Milan Fibiger) – bass guitar 
 František "Ferenc" Feco – drums 
 Míla Krovina – electric guitar 
 Ulric For (Oldřich "Olda" Liška) – timpani 
 Carles R. Apron (Karel Zástěra) – timpani , drums 
 Monster (Tomáš Vendl) – bass guitar 
 Miroslav "Mirek" Valenta – drums 
 Vlastimil "Vlasta" Voral – keyboards

Timeline

Discography

Demos 
 The Ritual Murder (demo, 1987)
 Finished (demo, 1988)
 The Mass (demo, 1989)
 The Fall of Idol (demo, 1990)
 Jilemnický okultista (demo, 1992)

Studio albums

Compilation albums 
 Ritual / The Jilemnice Occultist (2CD, 2001; re-release of the two albums)
 Ritual / The Jilemnice Occultist (4LP, 2009; re-release of the two albums)

Extended plays 
 Klavierstück (EP, 1991)

Live albums 
 Live in Zbraslav 18.5.1989 (1989)

References

External links
 Official webpage
 2010 Master's Hammer Interview

Czech black metal musical groups
Avant-garde metal musical groups
Experimental musical groups
Musical groups established in 1987
Musical groups disestablished in 1995
Musical groups reestablished in 2009